John Clifford Hill (24 February 1943 – 8 April 2021) was a professional rugby league footballer who played in the 1960s and 1970s.

He was born in St Helens Hospital, but raised in Ashton-in-Makerfield, Greater Manchester, England.

Playing career

International honours
Cliff Hill won a cap for Great Britain while at Wigan in 1966 against France.

County League appearances
Cliff Hill played in Wigan's victory in the Lancashire County Cup during the 1969–70 season

Challenge Cup Final appearances
Cliff Hill played  in Wigan's 20-16 victory over Hunslet in the 1965 Challenge Cup Final during the 1964–65 season at Wembley Stadium, London on Saturday 8 May 1965, in front of a crowd of 89,016, and played as an interchange/substitute (replacing  Colin Tyrer, and became the first ever Interchange/Substitute to play in a Challenge Cup Final) in Wigan's 2-7 defeat by Castleford in the 1970 Challenge Cup Final during the 1969–70 season at Wembley Stadium, London on Saturday 9 May 1970, in front of a crowd of 95,255.

County Cup Final appearances
Cliff Hill played  in Wigan's 16-13 victory over Oldham in the 1966 Lancashire County Cup Final during the 1966–67 season at Station Road, Swinton, on Saturday 29 October 1966.

BBC2 Floodlit Trophy Final appearances
Cliff Hill played , and scored a try in Wigan's 7-4 victory over St. Helens in the 1968 BBC2 Floodlit Trophy Final during the 1968–69 season at Central Park, Wigan on Tuesday 17 December 1968, and played  in the 6-11 defeat by Leigh in the 1969 BBC2 Floodlit Trophy Final during the 1969–70 season at Central Park, Wigan on Tuesday 16 December 1969.

Personal life 
Cliff Hill is the older brother of the rugby league footballer; David Hill.

References

External links
!Great Britain Statistics at englandrl.co.uk (statistics currently missing due to not having appeared for both Great Britain, and England)
Statistics at orl-heritagetrust.org.uk

1943 births
2021 deaths
Great Britain national rugby league team players
Lancashire rugby league team players
Oldham R.L.F.C. captains
Oldham R.L.F.C. players
People from St Helens, Merseyside
Rugby league five-eighths
Wigan Warriors players